Brimsdown is a neighbourhood of eastern Enfield in the London Borough of Enfield, north London, on the west side of the mid-to-lower Lea Valley.

Geography
The east of Brimsdown, that is, east of the eastern Lea Valley line is one of the borough's main commercial centres.  It divides into the Brimsdown Industrial Estate comprising Watermill, Sovereign, Leeside Business Centres, Riverwalk Business Park and storage.  Its far north is the Enfield Power Station built on part of the former Brimsdown Power Station and an electricity sub-station.

Residential Brimsdown is south of Turkey Brook, extending as far south as Jeffreys Road by the two blocks of the Trafalgar and Centenary Trading Estate units. It is home to the Brimsdown Industrial Estate and also includes a residential area just west of the Lea Valley railway line.  The western boundary is half way to the other Lea Valley line for this station-centric neighbourhood, where used as a term.

This area was the easternmost part of the old parish of Enfield which ecclesiastically is today divided into six, the present relevant parish being Enfield Highway a secular division of Enfield which competes with the west of the area for its identity, particularly around the irregular polygon of Durants Park, a large park, which is shared between both areas.

The area east of the Lea Valley Lines railway is almost exclusively industrial use, whereas west is a residential area primarily built up from the 1930s which blends into Enfield Highway to the west, Ponders End to the south and to the north Enfield Wash and Enfield Lock. This residential area around Brimsdown Avenue, Brimsdown railway station and Brimsdown School is at the heart of a Brimsdown neighbourhood, within Enfield, identity.

History 
Brimsdown was recorded as Grymesdoun in 1420, Grymesdoune 1441, Grymes downe, Brymesdowne 1610, Grymsdown, Brimsdown 1686. The first element may be a surname Gryme.  The second is the early and Middle English doun or down though unusually low for a down here referring to slightly raised ground in an area no more than 19 metres above sea level and 5 metres above the Lea, more than most of Edmonton to the south. Grīm as with Grim's Dyke to the west being linked to Woden.

In the 19th century the parish of Enfield had the second largest area north of the Thames in the two closest home counties for smallholdings run by families growing salads for the London market, with to a lesser degree fruit:

Nearest railway stations
 Brimsdown railway station

Watercourses 

 River Lee Navigation
   Mossops Creek was dug in the 1890s by Mosses and Co Gravel Extraction Company. The creek can be reached from Mossops Bridge (completed 1999) which spans the River Lee Navigation.

Mossops Creek Bridge (completed 2006) forms part of the Mossops Creek permissive path which links the Lee Navigation to the Brimsdown Industrial Estate and Brimsdown railway station.

Politics
 Brimsdown is part of the Enfield North constituency in the House of Commons.

Schools and colleges
Primary schools

Brimsdown Primary School, attended by academic Professor Philip Tew,  cartoonist and illustrator Ian West, and actor Ray Winstone.
 
College

Enfield College

Sport 
Football
Brimsdown Rovers: David Beckham joined the club as a 14-year-old where he played in the youth side.
Enfield Town FC : Goldsdown Park, Brimsdown is shared with Brimsdown Rovers AFC.

Brimsdown F.C. 
The Brimsdown Football Club is a football club based in Brimsdown, London, England. The club was established in 2013 when Lee Okugbeni, manager of the Kentish Town under-18 team, wanted the squad to progress to adult football; they were subsequently admitted to Division Two of the Spartan South Midlands League for the 2013–14 season. The club finished second-from-bottom of the division in their first season, but the 2014–15 season saw them finish fourth. However, Hale Leys United and Kent Athletic, who had finished first and second respectively, were unable to take promotion due to inadequate grounds, allowing Brimsdown to take promotion to Division One. The 2015–16 season saw the club enter the FA Vase for the first time. At the end of the 2019–20 season, the club were transferred to Division One South of the Eastern Counties League as a result of a groundshare with Tilbury.In February 2018, Ahmet Toygun and Yilmaz Celik took over the ownership and put in place a new structure. In May 2020, Ahmet Toygun become the full owner of the club and has merged his football academy under Brimsdown FC Academy. The club consist of 8 teams from U6 to First Team.

The club initially played on the second pitch at the Downs in Enfield, before moving to Goldsdown Road in 2014 after Enfield 1893 vacated the ground. In 2015–6 they groundshared at Enfield Town's Queen Elizabeth II Stadium, before moving to Haringey Borough's Coles Park in Tottenham in 2016, and then Ware's Wodson Park in 2018. They moved to Tilbury's Chadfields ground in 2020. In 2022, Brimsdown announced a groundsharing agreement with Wormley Rovers at Wormley Playing Fields.

Angling

Angling is allowed on the River Lee Navigation towpath between Enfield Lock and Ponder's End Lock. Information from the River Lea Anglers Club.

In popular culture
Between 1977 and 1980 a council house in the Green Street area of Brimsdown was the scene of alleged poltergeist activity. The incidents were the subject of a Sky Living television series The Enfield Haunting which was screened in May, 2015. Released in June 2016 The Conjuring 2 an American film also investigates the incidents.

References

External links 
 Hidden London Retrieved 13 November 2009

Areas of London
Places in Enfield, London
Districts of the London Borough of Enfield
Places formerly in Middlesex